Nearcha is a genus of moths in the family Geometridae described by Edward Guest in 1887. All species in the genus are known from Australia.

Species
Nearcha ursaria (Guenée, 1857)
Nearcha benecristata Warren, 1895
Nearcha dasyzona (Lower, 1903)
Nearcha tristificata (Walker, 1861)
Nearcha buffalaria (Guenée, 1857)
Nearcha aridaria (Walker, 1866)
Nearcha staurotis Meyrick, 1890
Nearcha pseudophaes Lower, 1893
Nearcha caronia Swinhoe, 1902
Nearcha ophla Swinhoe, 1902
Nearcha nullata (Guenée, 1857)
Nearcha atyla Meyrick, 1890
Nearcha curtaria (Guenée, 1857)

References

Oenochrominae